A maiden speech is the first speech given by a newly elected or appointed member of a legislature or parliament.

Traditions surrounding maiden speeches vary from country to country. In many Westminster system governments, there is a convention that maiden speeches should be relatively uncontroversial, often consisting of a general statement of the politician's beliefs and background rather than a partisan comment on a current topic.

This convention is not always followed, however. For example, the maiden speeches of Pauline Hanson in the Australian House of Representatives in 1996, and Richard Nixon in the United States House of Representatives in 1947, broke the tradition. Margaret Thatcher's maiden speech in the House of Commons in 1959 included the successful introduction of the bill which became the Public Bodies (Admission to Meetings) Act 1960.

There is also a strong convention in some countries, such as in the Netherlands, that maiden speeches should not be subjected to interruption or interjection and should not be attacked or dismissed by subsequent speakers. Another convention in the British House of Commons is that a Member of Parliament will include tribute in a maiden speech to previous incumbents of their seat.

Some countries, notably Australia, no longer formally describe a politician's first speech as a 'maiden' speech, referring only to it as a 'first' speech. The Australian Parliament website and Hansard records no longer use 'maiden' as a term; the word remains common in discourse and colloquial use.

UK House of Commons
The first maiden speeches following general elections were:

References

Speeches by type